Satoshi Higashi (born 16 November 1960) is a Japanese professional golfer.

Career
Higashi won seven tournaments on the Japan Golf Tour and featured in the top 100 of the Official World Golf Rankings. 

His most successful year was 1995 when he won four times and finished second on the Japan Golf Tour's money list, also gaining his highest World Ranking of 75th in the same year.

Professional wins (12)

Japan Golf Tour wins (7)

Japan Golf Tour playoff record (0–1)

Other wins (2)
1986 Acom Team Championship (with Hajime Meshiai)
1994 Meikyukai Charity Golf Tournament

Japan PGA Senior Tour wins (1)
2013 ISPS Handa Cup - Philanthropy Senior Tournament

Other senior wins (2)
2012 Asahi Ryokuken Cup TVQ Senior Open
2015 Trust Park Cup Sasebo Senior Open

Team appearances
Dunhill Cup (representing Japan): 1990
World Cup (representing Japan): 1991

References

External links

Satoshi Higashi at the PGA of Japan official website

Japanese male golfers
Japan Golf Tour golfers
Sportspeople from Tokyo
1960 births
Living people
20th-century Japanese people
21st-century Japanese people